The 15th Annual American Music Awards were held on January 25, 1988.

Winners and nominees

References

 http://www.rockonthenet.com/archive/1988/amas.htm

1988